Daş Veysəlli (also, Dashveysalli, Dashveysally, Dashveysaly, and Dash Veysalli) is a village in the Jabrayil Rayon of Azerbaijan. On 20 October 2020 President of Azerbaijan Ilham Aliyev claimed that the village had been captured from the Republic of Artsakh by Azerbaijani forces, though this has not yet been corroborated by third-party sources. On 17th of December 2020, Azerbaijan defence ministry published video footages of the village showing almost all buildings are destroyed.

References 

Populated places in Jabrayil District